Besa was a deme of ancient Athens, situated in the mining district, midway between Anaphlystus and Thoricus, and 300 stadia from Athens main city. Xenophon recommended the erection of a fortress at Besa, which would thus connect the two fortresses situated respectively at Anaphlystus and Thoricus. 

The site of Besa is located near the modern Synterina.

References

Populated places in ancient Attica
Former populated places in Greece
Demoi